This was the first edition of the tournament.

Lorenzo Musetti won the title after defeating Thiago Monteiro 7–6(7–2), 7–6(7–5) in the final.

Seeds

Draw

Finals

Top half

Bottom half

References

External links
Main draw
Qualifying draw

Internazionali di Tennis Città di Forlì - Singles
Internazionali di Tennis Città di Forlì